Secret Headquarters is a 2022 American superhero comedy film directed by Henry Joost and Ariel Schulman, who co-wrote the movie with Christopher L. Yost and Josh Koenigsberg, based on a story by Yost. Starring Owen Wilson, Walker Scobell, Jesse Williams, Keith L. Williams, Momona Tamada, Charles Melton, and Michael Peña, the plot follows a child (Scobell) and his friends (K. L. Williams, Tamada) who begins to suspect his father (Wilson) might be a superhero after discovering a secret headquarters in his basement.

The film premiered at the Signature Theater in Arlington, Virginia on August 8, 2022, and was released in the United States on August 12, 2022, on Paramount+. The film received generally mixed reviews from critics.

Plot
Jack Kincaid is The Guard, a superhero chosen by an alien artifact to inherit its powers and save the world, but his hero duties cause him to neglect his parental duties to his son Charlie, driving a wedge between them. When Charlie stays at Jack's house for his birthday, he invites his friends Berger, Lizzie, and Maya over, where they find Jack's underground lair and find out his secret identity. Meanwhile, a weapons CEO named Ansel Argon wants to use The Guard's power source for his own sinister schemes.

After the kids use Jack's gadgets, Argon's head mercenary, Sean Irons, brings his team to track down the power source. The kids fight back, and Jack manages to arrive just in time, but when Berger sends the source through a portal connected to his locker at school, Argon uses one of Jack's gadgets to get his own suit and kidnap Berger to find the source. Charlie leads his friends, plus Irons, to get their own gadgets to fight back. The showdown takes place during the school dance, ending with Charlie sending Argon through a portal to another dimension with a grenade. He ends up dancing with Maya and kissing her.

Charlie ends up joining Jack so they can fight crime together.

Cast
 Walker Scobell as Charlie Kincaid
 Louie Chaplin Moss as Younger Charlie Kincaid
 Owen Wilson as Jack Kincaid/The Guard, a superhero.
 Keith L. Williams as Berger
 Momona Tamada as Maya Monroe
 Michael Peña as Ansel Argon
 Jesse Williams as Sean Irons
 Charles Melton as Hawaii
 Abby James Witherspoon as Lizzie
 Kezii Curtis as Big Mac
 Jessie Mueller as Lily Kincaid
 Lucius Baston as Jerry the Janitor
 DK Metcalf as Coach Hammer
 Dustin Ingram as Jersey
 Levy Tran as Virginia
 Michael Anthony as Wisconsin
 Lav Luv as Umpire
 Dayna Beilenson as Ms. Squint
 David Lengel as Coach Skipper

Production 
Secret Headquarters was announced on May 6, 2021, when it was reported that Henry Joost and Ariel Schulman would direct the film for Paramount Pictures and would also work on the current draft for the project with Josh Koenigsberg from an original idea by Christopher Yost. In May 2021, Owen Wilson was cast in an undisclosed role. Principal photography began in Atlanta, Georgia on May 25, 2021. In June, Michael Peña, Walker Scobell, Momona Tamada, Keith L. Williams, Abby James Witherspoon, and Kezii Curtis were all announced as part of the cast. In July 2021, Jesse Williams joined the cast as the villain. Lorne Balfe composed the score.

Release
Secret Headquarters was released on Paramount+ on August 12, 2022. It was originally scheduled to be released in theaters on August 5, 2022 before moving to streaming on the same date. The film's red carpet premiere took place at the Signature Theater in New York City on August 8, 2022.

Critical reception
 Metacritic assigned the film a weighted average score of 47 out of 100, based on 13 critics, indicating "mixed or average reviews".

References

External links
 

2022 adventure films
2022 comedy films
2020s adventure comedy films
2020s superhero films
American adventure comedy films
American superhero films
Films directed by Henry Joost and Ariel Schulman
Films produced by Jerry Bruckheimer
Films scored by Lorne Balfe
Films shot in Atlanta
Films shot in Los Angeles
Paramount Pictures films
Paramount+ original films
2020s English-language films
Films about father–son relationships
2020s American films